The London, Midland and Scottish Railway (LMS) was involved in the development of railway electrification of Britain.  Like the LNER and the SR the LMS took over several schemes that had been developed by its constituent companies and also completed some of its own. All were suburban lines, in London, Liverpool and Manchester, and were usually steam lines converted to electric traction. Each service is listed below, showing dates of opening and the railway responsible for its conversion.

London District
Fourth rail, route length in 1927 was 40.2 miles (64.3 km).

 Whitechapel - Upminster, used by District Railway and opened in sections as follows:
 1905 Whitechapel - East Ham 
 1908 East Ham - Barking
 1932 Barking - Upminster
 1914 Willesden Junction - Earl's Court
 1916 Broad Street - Kew Bridge - Richmond
 Euston / Broad Street - Watford Junction, opened in sections as follows:
 1917 Willesden Junction - Watford Junction: London and North Western Railway (L&NWR). Jointly operated by the LNWR and the Bakerloo line at its opening
 1922 Euston and Broad Street connected to the line; branch to Croxley Green (L&NWR)
 1927 Rickmansworth branch (LMS)

See also Watford DC Line, North London Line and West London Line

Liverpool District
630 V DC third rail.

 Liverpool Exchange - Southport - Crossens and Ormskirk. Lancashire and Yorkshire Railway (L&YR)  
 1904, April  Liverpool - Southport 
 1906 Liverpool - Aintree (two routes). The independent Liverpool Overhead Railway (opened 1893-1905 and the world's first overhead electric railway) was connected to this line by a spur line. 
 1913 Aintree - Ormskirk
 1938 Birkenhead Park - West Kirby and New Brighton: the Wirral Railway/Mersey Railway.

Manchester District
 1908 Lancaster - Morecambe - Heysham. 6.6 kV AC overhead. Midland Railway
 1913 Bury - Holcombe Brook; 1916 extended to Manchester Victoria. Lancashire and Yorkshire Railway (L&YR). Third rail.
 11 May 1931 Manchester, South Junction and Altrincham Railway. 1500 V DC overhead. Joint LMS/LNER

See also
 British Rail Class 502
 British Rail Class 503
 LMS electric units
 LNWR electric units
 LYR electric units
 Railway electrification system
 List of railway electrification systems
 Railway electrification in Great Britain

London, Midland and Scottish Railway